Joseph Décembre, dit Décembre-Allonier (1836, Metz – 1906) was a 19th-century French writer, historiographer and freemason.

He was the author of a number of treatises or dictionaries, published in collaboration with his stepfather Edmond Allonier (1828–1871) under the collective name "Décembre-Allonier" and often confused with a single person.

Works 

1862: La Bohème littéraire
1863: Ce qu'il y a derrière un testament
1864: Typographie et gens de lettres
 Journal général de l'imprimerie et de la librairie
1864: Dictionnaire populaire illustré d'histoire, de géographie, de biographie, de technologie, de mythologie, d'antiquités, des beaux-arts et de littérature
1866–1868: Dictionnaire de la Révolution française, 1789–1799
1867: Les merveilles du nouveau Paris
1869: Histoire des conseils de guerre de 1852
1868: Le coup d'état du 2 décembre 1851

References

Bibliography 

 Viera Rebolledo-Dhuin, La librairie et le crédit. Réseaux et métiers du livre à Paris (1830–1870), thèse de doctorat d'histoire, volume I, 2011.

External links 

 Joseph Décembre on Wikisource
 Joseph Décembre on data.bnf.fr
  Décembre-Alonnier : pseudonyme collectif

19th-century French writers
French Freemasons
French historiographers
1836 births
Writers from Metz
1906 deaths